Gordon Anderson Burleigh (24 March 1889 — 7 July 1956) was an Australian rules footballer who played for Geelong in the Victorian Football League (now known as the Australian Football League).

References

External links
 
 

1889 births
1956 deaths
Geelong Football Club players
Australian rules footballers from Victoria (Australia)